Iacob or Iacov is the Romanian form for Jacob and James and it may refer to:

People
Alexandru Iacob (born 1989), Romanian footballer
Caius Iacob (1912–1992), Romanian mathematician
Iacob Felix (1832–1905), Romanian physician
Iacob Iacobovici (1879–1959), Romanian surgeon
Mihai Iacob (1933–2009), Romanian film director and screenwriter
Monica Iacob Ridzi (born 1977), Romanian politician and Member of the European Parliament
Paul Iacob (born 1996), Romanian footballer
Victoraș Iacob (born 1980), Romanian footballer
Ioan Iacob Heraclid (1511–1563), Greek soldier and ruler of Moldavia from 1561 to 1563

Geography
Iacob River, tributary of the Putna River in Romania
Pârâul lui Iacob, tributary of the Asău River in Romania
Valea lui Iacob River, tributary of the Râul Vadului in Romania

Romanian masculine given names
Romanian-language surnames